Daakaka  (also known as Dakaka, South Ambrym and Baiap) is a native language of Ambrym, Vanuatu.  It is spoken by about one thousand speakers in the south-western corner of the island.

Vitality
Most children in the region still acquire Daakaka as a first language, but it is under threat by significant socio-economic changes and the dominant use of Vanuatu's official languages, Bislama, English and French, in education and in official contexts.

Phonology

Consonants
The system of consonantal phonemes is fairly typical for the region. Voiced stops are prenasalized. The difference between bilabial consonants with and without a labio-velar release is relevant only before front vowels.

Vowels
There are seven phonemically distinct vowel qualities, with one long and one short vowel phoneme for each variety, plus a marginally phonemic  .  The distinction between mid and open-mid vowels is only phonemic after alveolar consonants, as in tee  "axe" vs. téé  "see".

Word classes
The four major word classes are nouns, verbs, adjectives and adverbs. Only nouns can stand in argument position, only verbs and some adjectives can be used as predicates without the copula i, only adjectives can be used as attributes to nouns without further modification. The two biggest word classes by far are nouns and verbs.

Nouns
There are three subclasses of nouns. The biggest subclass consists of 'general nouns' such as em "house" or  "volcano"; in contrast to the other two classes, these nouns do not need to specify a possessor, they cannot be inflected and they cannot be directly followed by another noun phrase. 'Inflected nouns' always indicate their possessor by a person-number ending:

Transitive or relational nouns also obligatorily specify an inalienable possessor, but this possessor is given by a subsequent noun phrase, not by an inflectional ending. Known, definite, non-human possessors can also be indicated by the suffix -sye or its allomorph -tye:

Verbs
Among verbs, there are several subgroups which differ either in terms of transitivity or in terms of the number of their internal argument (the subject of an intransitive verb or the object of a transitive verb).

Transitivity
There are three degrees of transitivity: verbs can be either intransitive, semitransitive or transitive. Intransitive verbs such as oko "walk" never take an object noun phrase. Semitransitive verbs can optionally be followed by an object noun phrase with indefinite reference; by contrast, transitive verbs are always interpreted to have a definite object.

Pluractionality
While most verbs are neutral with regard to the number of their arguments, some verbs can take only singular arguments and some (pluractional) verbs can only take non-singular arguments. For example,  and  all mean "fall down", but only  can have either a singular or a plural subject. By contrast,  can only take a singular subject, while the subject of  always refers to more than one entity (starred examples, in red cells, are ungrammatical):

Clauses

Basic clause structure

A simple assertive clause always contains a subject pronoun, a TAM marker and a predicate - except for third person singular subjects, for which there is no subject pronoun. Predicates can consist of a verb, an adjective or a copula plus noun phrase (NP) or adverbial phrase.

Third person pronouns may be preceded by a subject NP. A few examples are given below:

 Subject pronoun + TAM + VP

 Subject NP + TAM + Adjective

 Subject NP + TAM + Copula + NP

Personal Pronouns
There are two kinds of personal pronouns, subject pronouns and non-subject pronouns. Subject pronouns end in a vowel and are followed directly by a TAM marker. They are obligatory in assertive clauses. Non-subject pronouns are used as topics or objects of verbs or prepositions. Each pronoun represents a combination of a person and a number value. There are four person values: first person inclusive (including both the speaker and the listener), first person exclusive (including only the speaker, not the listener), second person (including the listener) and third person (including neither speaker nor listener). The four number values are singular (one person), dual (two persons), paucal (few persons) and plural (an arbitrarily large number of persons).

Notes

Bibliography

External links
Database of audio recordings in Daakaka (Sesivi) - basic Catholic prayers
Kilu von Prince. 2017. Daakaka dictionary. Dictionaria 1. 1-2167. [access to raw data set: ]

Languages of Vanuatu
Paama–Ambrym languages